Zahur Hossain Chowdhury (died 1980) was a Bangladeshi journalist. He was awarded Ekushey Padak in 1981 by the Government of Bangladesh for his contribution to journalism.

Career
Chowdhury started his career in the Indian newspaper The Statesman. He became the editor of The Sangbad in 1954. Other journalists like Ranesh Das Gupta, Satyen Sen, Santosh Gupta, Kamal Lohani and Mohammad Farhad also joined the Sangbad.

Chowdhury also served as an editor of The Bangladesh Observer.

Awards
 Ekushey Padak (1981)

References

External links
A photograph of Zahur Hossain Chowdhury

1980 deaths
Recipients of the Ekushey Padak
Bangladeshi journalists
People from Daganbhuiyan Upazila